The men's team foil was one of seven fencing events on the fencing at the 1936 Summer Olympics programme. It was the sixth appearance of the event. The competition was held from 2 to 4 August 1936. 99 fencers from 17 nations competed. Each team could have a maximum of six fencers, with four participating in any given match.

The competition format continued the pool play round-robin from prior years. Each of the four fencers from one team would face each of the four from the other, for a total of 16 bouts per match. The team that won more bouts won the match, with competition potentially stopping when one team reached 9 points out of the possible 16 (this did not always occur and matches sometimes continued). If the bouts were 8–8, touches received was used to determine the winning team. Pool matches unnecessary to the result were not played; this rule affected all 10 of the pools in the first two rounds, which stopped after 2 of 3 possible matches when one team lost both.

Rosters

Argentina
 Roberto Larraz
 Héctor Lucchetti
 Ángel Gorordo
 Luis Lucchetti
 Rodolfo Valenzuela
 Manuel Torrente

Austria
 Hans Lion
 Roman Fischer
 Hans Schönbaumsfeld
 Ernst Baylon
 Josef Losert
 Karl Sudrich

Belgium
 Georges de Bourguignon
 André Van De Werve De Vorsselaer
 Henri Paternóster
 Raymond Bru
 Jean Heeremans
 Paul Valcke

Brazil
 Moacyr Dunham
 Ennio de Oliveira
 Ricardo Vagnotti
 Lodovico Alessandri

Canada
 Bertrand Boissonnault
 Don Collinge
 George Tully
 Charles Otis
 Ernest Dalton

Czechoslovakia
 Hervarth Frass von Friedenfeldt
 František Vohryzek
 Jiří Jesenský
 Bohuslav Kirchmann
 Josef Hildebrand

Denmark
 Erik Hammer Sørensen
 Kim Bærentzen
 Aage Leidersdorff
 Caspar Schrøder
 Svend Jacobsen

Egypt
 Mahmoud Abdin
 Mauris Shamil
 Hassan Hosni Tawfik
 Anwar Tawfik

France
 André Gardère
 Edward Gardère
 René Lemoine
 René Bondoux
 Jacques Coutrot
 René Bougnol

Germany
 Siegfried Lerdon
 August Heim
 Julius Eisenecker
 Erwin Casmir
 Stefan Rosenbauer
 Otto Adam

Great Britain
 Denis Pearce
 David Bartlett
 Emrys Lloyd
 Geoffrey Hett
 Christopher Hammersley
 Roger Tredgold

Greece
 Konstantinos Botasis
 Spyridon Ferentinos
 Konstantinos Bembis
 Nikolaos Manolesos
 Menelaos Psarrakis

Hungary
 József Hátszeghy
 Lajos Maszlay
 Aladár Gerevich
 Béla Bay
 Ottó Hátszeghy
 Antal Zirczy

Italy
 Manlio Di Rosa
 Giulio Gaudini
 Gioacchino Guaragna
 Gustavo Marzi
 Giorgio Bocchino
 Ciro Verratti

Norway
 Nils Jørgensen
 Jens Frølich
 Johan Falkenberg
 Thorstein Guthe

Switzerland
 Michel Fauconnet
 Édouard Fitting
 Jean Rubli
 Gottfried von Meiss
 Constantin Antoniades

United States
 Joe Levis
 Hugh Alessandroni
 John Potter
 John Hurd
 Warren Dow
 Bill Pecora

Yugoslavia
 Branko Tretinjak
 Edo Marion
 Mirko Koršič
 Marjan Pengov
 Aleksandar Nikolić
 Ivan Vladimir Mažuranić

Results

Round 1
The top two teams in each pool advanced to round 2.

Pool 1

Switzerland defeated Greece on touches received (64–68) after the bouts were tied at 8 apiece. Belgium also defeated Greece. This resulted in Greece being eliminated and the match between Belgium and Switzerland not being played.

Pool 2

France and Yugoslavia each defeated Brazil. This resulted in Brazil being eliminated and the match between France and Yugoslavia not being played.

Pool 3

Argentina and Czechoslavkia each defeated Denmark. This resulted in Denmark being eliminated and the match between Argentina and Czechoslavkia not being played.

Pool 4

Germany and Great Britain each defeated Canada. This resulted in Canada being eliminated and the match between Germany and Great Britain not being played.

Pool 5

Italy and Austria each defeated Egypt. This resulted in Egypt being eliminated and the match between Italy and Austria not being played.

Pool 6

The United States and Hungary each defeated Norway. This resulted in Norway being eliminated and the match between the United States and Hungary not being played.

Round 2

The top two teams in each pool advanced to the semifinals.

Pool 1

Germany and Great Britain advanced from the same first-round group, but had not played each other yet. Great Britain was defeated after losing to both Argentina and Germany, who did not play each other. The match between Argentina and Great Britain was decided on touches received, 57–62, after being tied on individual bouts 8–8.

Pool 2

Italy and the United States each defeated Switzerland. This resulted in Switzerland being eliminated and the match between Italy and the United States not being played.

Pool 3

France and Hungary each defeated Yugoslavia. This resulted in Yugoslavia being eliminated and the match between France and Hungary not being played.

Pool 4

Austria and Belgium each defeated Czechoslovakia. This resulted in Czechoslovakia being eliminated and the match between Austria and Belgium not being played.

Semifinals

The top two teams in each pool advanced to the final.

Semifinal 1

Italy and the United States advanced from the same second-round group, but had not played each other yet. Italy defeated each of the three other teams. Austria had a decisive 12–4 win against the United States, but fell to Hungary on touches received 53–63 after the individual bouts were 8–8. Hungary in turn lost to the United States, 9–7, creating a three-way tie for second place. Austria had lost the fewest individual bouts and advanced.

Semifinal 2

Germany and Argentina advanced from the same second-round group, but had not played each other yet. France remained undefeated, beating each of the other three teams. Germany defeated Belgium and Argentina to advance as well, with Belgium finishing third in the group with a win over Argentina.

Final

In the first pairings, Italy beat Austria while France defeated Germany. In the second, France defeated Austria while Italy beat Germany. The third and final pairings of the round-robin became effectively a gold-medal final between Italy and France (both of whom were undefeated to that point) as well as a bronze-medal match featuring Germany and Austria. Italy reached 9 wins after 13 individual bouts, securing the gold medal while France took silver. Germany accumulated 9 wins in 14 bouts, earning bronze.

References

Foil team
Men's events at the 1936 Summer Olympics